The Puerto Rico Office of the Special Independent Prosecutor's Panel is an autonomous agency of the executive branch of the government of Puerto Rico that appoints Special Independent Prosecutors  (FEI) to investigate and prosecute government officials who engage in criminal conduct. FEIs are equivalent to special prosecutors while the agency is synonymous to the United States Department of Justice Office of Special Counsel but at the state government level rather than federal.

References

Secretariat of Governance of Puerto Rico